Ewa Dałkowska (born 10 April 1947 in Wrocław) is a Polish actress. She performed in more than thirty films since 1973.

Selected filmography

External links

Profile on filmpolski.pl 

1947 births
20th-century Polish actresses
21st-century Polish actresses
Actors from Wrocław
Living people
Polish film actresses
Polish stage actresses
Recipients of the Bronze Cross of Merit (Poland)
Officers of the Order of Polonia Restituta
Recipients of the Silver Medal for Merit to Culture – Gloria Artis